William of Melitona, Meliton or Middleton (died 1257) was a Catholic theologian. By 1248, he was a master in theology, teaching at the University of Cambridge and as the Franciscan chair of theology at the University of Paris.

References

Notes

Year of birth unknown
1257 deaths
Franciscan theologians